Copelatus longicornis is a species of diving beetle. It is part of the genus Copelatus in the subfamily Copelatinae of the family Dytiscidae. It was described by Sharp in 1882.

References

longicornis
Beetles described in 1882